On Ting may refer to:
 On Ting Estate, a public housing estate in Tuen Mun, Hong Kong
 On Ting stop, an MTR Light Rail stop adjacent to the estate